Andrew Peterson (born June 4, 1974) is an American Christian musician and author, who plays folk rock, roots rock, and country gospel music.

Peterson is a founding member of the Square Peg Alliance, a group of Christian songwriters. He has toured with Caedmon's Call, Fernando Ortega, Michael Card, Sara Groves, Bebo Norman, Nichole Nordeman, Jill Phillips, Andy Gullahorn, Ben Shive, Eric Peters, and other members of the Square Peg Alliance.

Peterson is the author of The Wingfeather Saga series of children and young adult fantasy novels. The four-part series is currently being adapted into an animated TV show.

Musical career
In 1996, Peterson began touring across America with his wife Jamie and instrumentalist Gabe Scott. Peterson had yet to release a full-length album, and had no recording contract. Caedmon's Call lead guitarist and vocalist Derek Webb came across his website, and was so impressed by the lyrics that he invited Peterson to open for his band at an upcoming show. The band enjoyed his performance and he was invited to join them on their 1998 tour.

This led to Peterson signing in 1999 with Watershed/Essential Records. His first full-length album, Carried Along, was released in 2000. The album, including "Nothing to Say", was listed on CCM Magazine's list of the Top 10 albums of 2000.

Peterson's second album, Clear to Venus, was released on September 11, 2001.

In 2003, Peterson released Love and Thunder. It featured Alison Krauss, Cliff Young and Randall Goodgame and was produced by Dove Award-winning Christian music veteran Steve Hindalong. Also in 2003, Peterson read narration for the audio version of Ray Blackston's novel Flabbergasted, and Caedmon's Call recorded "Mystery of Mercy", a song Peterson co-wrote with Randall Goodgame, for their album Back Home.

In 2004, Peterson's song "Family Man", from the album Love and Thunder, was nominated in the category "Country Recorded Song of the Year" for the 35th Annual Dove Awards. Peterson also released a Christmas album, Behold the Lamb of God: The True Tall Tale of the Coming of Christ. Since the holiday season of 2001, Peterson and a wide variety of fellow Nashville area musicians have gone on tour playing the songs from the album, culminating in an annual performance in Nashville's Ryman Auditorium. Peterson recorded a new edition of the album that was released on October 25, 2019.

In 2005, Peterson released The Far Country and Appendix A: Bootlegs and B Sides.

In 2006, Peterson worked with his friend Randall Goodgame to release Slugs & Bugs & Lullabies, a children's album. The album produced two tracks which were featured on the newest video in the bestselling VeggieTales series called The Wonderful Wizard of Ha's. Peterson sang the song "Arise, Arise" on Songs from the Voice, Vol. 2: Son of the Most High, a compilation album produced by Don Chaffer of Waterdeep. That same year, Michael Card recorded Peterson's song "The Silence of God" for his album The Hidden Face of God. Peterson appeared on Card's radio show on numerous occasions.

In 2007, Peterson independently released Appendix M: Media / Music / Movies, an EP containing live versions, original demos, and rarities. Later that year, Randy Travis recorded Peterson's "Labor of Love" for his 2007 Christmas album Songs of the Season.

In July 2008, Peterson signed with the Christian label Centricity Music. On October 21, 2008, Peterson released Resurrection Letters, Volume Two, a collection of songs about what the resurrection of Jesus Christ means for people today. The album reached No. 9 on Billboard's Top Christian Albums chart.

In August 2010 Peterson released Counting Stars, which debuted at No. 7 on Billboards Top Christian Albums chart. His single from the album, "Dancing in the Minefields", reached No. 13 on Billboards Top Christian Songs chart and stayed on the chart for 19 weeks.

On August 24, 2012 Andrew released the album Light for the Lost Boy to critical acclaim, due to a fuller band sound which maintains his depth of lyrical content.

In October 2016, Peterson released The Burning Edge of Dawn, which includes a song sung with his daughter Skye.

Peterson released a five-song EP, Resurrection Letters: Prologue, in February 2018, as a follow-up to Resurrection Letters, Volume 2. On March 30, Resurrection Letters, Volume One was released. This album contained "Is He Worthy?" written by Peterson and Ben Shive, which was covered on Chris Tomlin's Holy Roar album on September 28, 2018.

Writing
In 2007, Andrew Peterson published The Ballad of Matthew's Begats with illustrator Cory Godbey. It is a children's book based on the song of the same name from Peterson's annual Christmas show, Behold the Lamb of God: The True Tall Tale of the Coming of Christ.

Peterson also wrote a four-book series of fantasy/adventure novels for young adults entitled The Wingfeather Saga published by Waterbrook Press, a subsidiary of Random House and Rabbit Room Press. The first novel, On the Edge of the Dark Sea of Darkness, was released March 18, 2008. The second novel in the series, North! Or Be Eaten, winner of the 2010 Christy Award for Young Adult Fiction, was released August 18, 2009, and the third novel in the series, The Monster in the Hollows, was released in May 2011. The series concluded with The Warden and the Wolf King, and won the 2015 Clive Staples Award (named after C.S. Lewis) for Imaginative Fiction. This novel was funded successfully through Kickstarter in August 2013 and was released in July 2014.

The Wingfeather Saga is being adapted into an animated television series by Angel Studios. In 2016, a Kickstarter campaign funded a pilot episode which was released in 2017 as a short film. An equity crowdfunding effort was launched in 2021 and successfully raised $5 million to produce the first season of the series, which is slated for release in December 2022. Peterson is a producer of the series.

In 2019, Peterson published Adorning the Dark: Thoughts on Community, Calling, and the Mystery of Making, a semi-autobiographical work. The book earned "Book of the Year" honors from Christianity Today, and World.

Musical style
Peterson plays in the vein of a folk, rock, bluegrass, country, blues, and pop musician, while to a lesser extent rock and roll, where this enables him to play Christian pop, Christian rock, folk rock, roots rock, and country gospel styles and genres of music.

Discography

Albums

Singles
(Selective singles and videos)
 2000: "Nothing to Say"
 2004: "Family Man"
 2010: "Dancing in the Minefields" (peaked at No. 13 on Billboard's Top Christian Songs chart)
 2012: "Rest Easy"
 2014: "After All These Years"
 2018: "Is He Worthy?"

Video
 2005: Behold the Lamb of God Live (DVD)

Books
 2007: The Ballad of Matthew's Begats
 2008: On the Edge of the Dark Sea of Darkness: The Wingfeather Saga, Book One
 2009: North! Or Be Eaten: The Wingfeather Saga, Book Two
 2011: The Monster in the Hollows: The Wingfeather Saga, Book Three
 2014: The Warden and the Wolf King: The Wingfeather Saga, Book Four
 2014: Pembrick's Creaturepedia (Illustrated by Aedan Peterson)
 2016: Wingfeather Tales (editor)
2019: Adorning the Dark (nonfiction/memoir)
2021: The God of the Garden (nonfiction/memoir)

Awards

GMA Dove Awards

References

External links
 
 www.WingfeatherSaga.com The Wingfeather Saga Online

1974 births
Performers of contemporary Christian music
American performers of Christian music
21st-century American novelists
American male novelists
Place of birth missing (living people)
Centricity Music artists
Fervent Records artists
Living people
People from Monticello, Illinois
Musicians from Illinois
Novelists from Illinois
21st-century American male writers
Christian novelists